These are the Billboard magazine R&B albums to have reached number one in 1989.

Chart history

See also
1989 in music
R&B number-one hits of 1989 (USA)

1989